Dianthus sylvestris, the wood pink, is a species of Dianthus found in Europe, particularly in the Alps, and also said to be disjunctly found in the mountains of Greece. A perennial, it prefers to grow in drier, stony places, so it is occasionally planted in rock gardens.

Subspecies
A number of subspecies have been described:

Dianthus sylvestris subsp. alboroseus F.K.Mey.
Dianthus sylvestris subsp. aristidis (Batt.) Greuter & Burdet
Dianthus sylvestris subsp. boissieri (Willk.) Dobignard
Dianthus sylvestris subsp. longibracteatus (Maire) Greuter & Burdet
Dianthus sylvestris subsp. tergestinus (Rchb.) Hayek

References

sylvestris
Garden plants of Europe
Plants described in 1787
Taxa named by Franz Xaver von Wulfen